Marco Cappai (born 13 November 1993 in Carbonia, Sardinia), known by his stage name Madh, meaning "my advice doesn't help", is an Italian singer, rapper and songwriter. He rose to fame in 2014, at the eighth season of the Italian edition of X Factor. His debut single, "Sayonara", was performed for the first time during the semi-finals of the competition. Also included in the extended play with the same name, the single reached the second spot of the Italian Singles Chart, and it was certified platinum by the Federation of the Italian Music Industry. In 2018 he deleted all of his content on Instagram and went on hiatus.

Early life
Marco Cappai was born on 13 November 1993 in Carbonia, a comune in the former province of Carbonia-Iglesias (now province of South Sardinia), in Sardinia, Italy, where he also spent childhood.

Music career

2011–2014
In 2011, Madh began creating songs with his brother. In 2012, he met some music publishers and record producers, and decided to found an independent label, the SEMS Music. He started self-producing video clips and uploading them on YouTube and on other various platforms. At the start of his musical career, he performed in clubs, bars and disco clubs in Sardinia. He won the first prize of a traditional Sardinian contest "Corrida Sulcis".

2014: The X Factor
In June 2014 in Rome, Madh auditioned as a solo candidate for the eighth season of the Italian edition of  The X Factor. In front of Italian judges Fedez, Mika, Morgan and Victoria Cabello, he performed the alternative song version Mad World of Gary Jules; in "bootcamp", he performed Enjoy the silence (Depeche Mode). In July 2014 in Milan, at "homevisit" with the song Exodus (MIA), he qualifying for the "Men Under 24" category, captained by Fedez. From 23 October 2014 to 11 December 2014, during the "live show" in Milan, Madh performed: Take Care (Drake), No Church in the Wild (Jay Z, Kanye West ft. Frank Ocean), Dancing on My Own (Robyn), Same Love (Macklemore & Ryan Lewis ft. Mary Lambert), Disparate Youth (Santigold), Ready or Not (Fugees), Lights (Ellie Goulding), Flyover (Asian Dub Foundation), Heartbeat (Nneka).

Musical style and influences
His passion and love for music have been influenced by the Eastern culture and philosophy. Five of the most important songs of his life are: "Love Is A Losing Game" and "You Know I'm No Good" (Amy Winehouse), "Redemption Song" (Bob Marley), "Ready Or Not" (Fugees), Exodus (MIA).

Discography

Studio albums

EPs

Singles

Album appearances

Music videos

References

External links
 Madh at Allmusic
 

1993 births
Italian rappers
Living people
X Factor (Italian TV series) contestants
People from the Province of South Sardinia
English-language singers from Italy
21st-century Italian male  singers